The People's Vanguard Party was a Ba'athist political party in South Yemen. It was aligned with the Syrian-based Ba'ath Party. Abdullah Badhib was the general secretary of the party. Badhib was appointed Minister of Education in December 1969. The party was one of two non-National Front parties tolerated during the early 1970s. In October 1975 it joined the NF-dominated United Political Organization (which evolved into the Yemeni Socialist Party in 1978). The merger was ratified by the third PVP congress held in August 1975.

References

Arab nationalism in Yemen
Ba'athist parties
Yemen
Defunct political parties in Yemen
Political parties disestablished in 1975
Political parties with year of establishment missing
Socialist parties in Yemen
Yemeni Socialist Party